American recording artist Monica has appeared in numerous music videos. Her videography includes more than thirty music videos. At age thirteen, Monica signed with Arista and released her debut album Miss Thang in 1995. An accompanying music video for the single, shot in black-and-white, was directed by Rich Murray and released in June 1995. In 1998, her second album The Boy Is Mine earned her major international chart success. Pushed by its number-one hit title track, a duet with singer Brandy, won the Best Clip (R&B/Urban) accolade at the 1998 Billboard Music Awards and received two MTV Video Music Award nominations.

Music videos

1990s

2000s

2010s

2020s

Guest appearances

References

Videographies of American artists